Silene flos-jovis, the flower-of-Jove, is a species of flowering plant in the family Caryophyllaceae, native to the central Alps and found at elevations of .

Under its former name, Lychnis flos-jovis, it has gained the Royal Horticultural Society's Award of Garden Merit.

References

flos-jovis